The 1931 Clemson Tigers football team was an American football team that represented Clemson College in the Southern Conference during the 1931 college football season. In their first season under head coach Jess Neely, the Tigers compiled a 1–6–2 record (1–4 against conference opponents), finished 20th in the conference, and was outscored by a total of 164 to 19. D. Fordham was the team captain.

Schedule

References

Clemson
Clemson Tigers football seasons
Clemson Tigers football